Gianmarco Zigoni (born 10 May 1991) is an Italian professional footballer who plays as a forward for  club Juve Stabia.

Club career

Early career 
Raised in Oderzo, Zigoni started playing football with local team Opitergina, before joining Treviso's youth system, where he scored more than one hundred goals. He made his professional debut with the club in a Serie B game against Ancona on 26 January 2009, aged 17. The match ended in a 2–1 loss for Treviso, with Zigoni scoring their lone goal. He scored his second goal only four days later, in a 3–2 win against Brescia. The young striker went on to make a total of 18 appearances for Treviso in the 2008–09 season, being included 8 times in the starting line-up.

Milan 
Coming to the attention of several Serie A clubs, such Fiorentina, Internazionale and Juventus, Zigoni was eventually signed by Milan at the beginning of the 2009–10 season, for €1.3 million. He became a regular of their youth team, scoring a total of 19 goals in league and cup games. In particular, he scored in both legs of the Coppa Italia Primavera final, as Milan defeated Palermo 3–1 on aggregate to lift the trophy 25 years after the club's last success in the competition.

As for the first team, Zigoni made only one appearance during the season. He came off the bench in the final minutes of a league game against Lazio, which ended in 1–1 draw, on 28 March 2010.

Genoa 
In July 2010, Zigoni was transferred to Genoa in co-ownership for €3.75 million, as part of the deal that saw defender Sokratis Papastathopoulos join Milan. With the youth team of his new club Zigoni scored two goals in the Supercoppa Primavera, as Genoa defeated 5–0 his former Milan teammates to secure the trophy. However, he failed to get any first-team appearances in his first months at the club.

Subsequently, on 29 January 2011, Zigoni was sent out on loan to Serie B club Frosinone. In his short stint with the club, he made a mere six appearances with a single goal, and Frosinone ended being relegated to the third tier at the end of the season.

Milan return and loans 
On 24 May 2011, Milan re-acquired the second half of Zigoni from Genoa for the same fee, before being sent on loan to Avellino for the season. Next season he was sent on another loan spell to Serie B club Pro Vercelli. However, during the January transfer window he was called back and sent on a second loan spell to Avellino. Avellino promoted to Serie B at the end of season.

On 29 July 2013 he was signed by Italian third division club U.S. Lecce, re-joining teammate Giacomo Beretta and Marcus Diniz. Next season, he moved to Monza, once again on loan. On 8 January 2015 Zigoni was released by Monza. He was signed by SPAL on loan. The loan was extended on 13 July 2015, and again on 15 July 2016.

Venezia 
On 10 August 2017, Zigoni was signed by Serie B side Venezia, on a season-long loan deal with an obligation to buy.

Serie C 
On 19 September 2020 he joined Novara on loan. On 30 January 2021 he was sub-loaned to Mantova.

On 31 January 2022, Zigoni was sold to Serie C club Virtus Verona on a permanent transfer.

On 9 September 2022, Zigoni moved to Juve Stabia on a one-season contract.

International career 
Zigoni won his first international cap in February 2009, shortly after his debut in Serie B with Treviso, being called up by Italy U-20 for a game against Austria. Italy lost 2–1, with Zigoni himself scoring their lone goal.

Zigoni went on to be selected also at under-18 and under-19 level, being capped a total of 10 times and scoring 5 goals. Among the 5 goals, 3 of them was from 3 substitute appearances in 2010 UEFA European Under-19 Football Championship qualification. However Zigoni was dropped out from the squad for the elite round and the final tournament as the team already had Mattia Destro, Fabio Borini and Nicolao Dumitru as centre forwards.

Personal life
Zigoni was born in Verona, the son of former Juventus, Roma, and Hellas Verona striker Gianfranco Zigoni and grandnephew of former Napoli midfielder Pierluigi Ronzon.

Career statistics 

1European competitions include the UEFA Champions League.
2Other tournaments include none to date.

References

External links 
 Profile at Assocalciatori.it 
 International caps at FIGC.it 
 

1991 births
Living people
Footballers from Verona
Italian footballers
Italy youth international footballers
Treviso F.B.C. 1993 players
A.C. Milan players
Genoa C.F.C. players
Frosinone Calcio players
U.S. Avellino 1912 players
U.S. Lecce players
F.C. Pro Vercelli 1892 players
A.C. Monza players
S.P.A.L. players
Venezia F.C. players
Novara F.C. players
Mantova 1911 players
Virtus Verona players
S.S. Juve Stabia players
Association football forwards
Serie A players
Serie B players
Serie C players